LHTEC (Light Helicopter Turbine Engine Company) is a joint venture between Rolls-Royce and Honeywell. The company was originally a partnership between the Allison Engine Company and AlliedSignal Aerospace.
In 1995 Rolls-Royce acquired Allison, and AlliedSignal merged with Honeywell in 1999, and adopted its name.

The partnership was formed to develop the T800 turboshaft engine for the United States Army's RAH-66 Comanche armed reconnaissance helicopter. Despite the cancellation of this 650+ aircraft project, the company has been able to sell the T800, and its civil CTS800 model, for other applications, namely the AgustaWestland Super Lynx and AW159 Wildcat.

Products
 LHTEC T800/CTS800 turboshaft and CTP800 turboprop

References

External links
 Honeywell CTS800 page 
 Rolls-Royce CTS800 page

Aircraft engine manufacturers of the United States
Turboshaft engine manufacturers